{{safesubst:#invoke:RfD||2=Chem. Eur.|month = March
|day =  4
|year = 2023
|time = 16:35
|timestamp = 20230304163505

|content=
REDIRECT Chemistry: A European Journal

}}